Joseph (Josef) Halla (2 June 1814 – 12 January 1887) was an Austrian physician of Czech parentage born in Prague.

In 1847 he received his medical doctorate from the University of Prague, and shortly afterwards obtained his habilitation. From 1850 to 1854 he was an associate professor and director of the Prague medical clinic. Afterwards he served as a "full professor" and chief physician at the Allgemaine Krankenhaus. In 1867 he was rector of the university.

At Prague he was an editor of the journal Vierteljahrschrift Für Die Praktische Heilkunde. In 1865 he became an honorary member of the Société médicale allemande de Paris.

Written works 
 Einiges über Classification (1846). 
 Über Aethereinathmungen (1847) – On inhalation of ether. 
 Entwurf einer Universitätsreform (1849) – Draft on university reform.
 Beobb. über Aneurysmen der Brustaorta (1864) – On aneurysms of the thoracic aorta.

References 
 Pagel: Biographisches Lexikon (translated biography)

Physicians from Prague
Academic staff of Charles University
1814 births
1887 deaths
19th-century Czech physicians